This article lists the main modern pentathlon events and their results for 2012.

2012 Summer Olympics (UIPM)
 August 11 & 12: 2012 Summer Olympics in  London at the Copper Box Arena, the London Aquatics Centre, & Greenwich Park
 Men:   David Svoboda;   Cao Zhongrong;   Ádám Marosi
 Women:   Laura Asadauskaitė;   Samantha Murray;   Yane Marques

World modern pentathlon events
 May 7 – 13: 2012 World Modern Pentathlon Championships in  Rome
 Individual winners:  Aleksander Lesun (m) /  Mhairi Spence (f)
 Men's Team Relay winners:  (Jung Jin-hwa, HONG Jin-woo, & Hwang Woo-jin)
 Women's Team Relay winners:  (Lena Schöneborn, Janine Kohlmann, & Annika Schleu)
 Mixed Team Relay winners:  (Ganna Buriak & Oleksandr Mordasov)
 Men's Team winners:  (Riccardo De Luca, Nicola Benedetti, & Pier Paolo Petroni)
 Women's Team winners:  (Heather Fell, Samantha Murray, & Mhairi Spence)
 September 3 – 8: 2012 World Junior Modern Pentathlon Championships in  Drzonków
 Junior Individual winners:  Valentin Belaud (m) /  Margaux Isaksen (f)
 Junior Men's Team Relay winners:  (Kim Dae-beom, KIM Soeng-jin, & KIM Kyeong-pil)
 Junior Women's Team Relay winners:  (Samantha Achterberg, Margaux Isaksen, & Isabella Isaksen)
 Junior Mixed Team Relay winners:  (Olga Sislova & Pavels Svecovs)
 Junior Men's Team winners:  (Ilya Shugarov, Dmitry Lukach, & Maksim Kustov)
 Junior Women's Team winners:  (Samantha Achterberg, Isabella Isaksen, & Margaux Isaksen)
 September 19 – 23: 2012 World Youth Modern Pentathlon Championships in  Tata
 Youth Individual winners:  Oleg Naumov (m) /  Ieva Serapinaitė (f)
 Youth Men's Team Relay winners:  (Fabian Liebig, Marvin Faly Dogue, & Christian Zillekens)
 Youth Women's Team Relay winners:  (Ekaterina Makarova, Elizabet Rodriguez, & Sofia Serkina)
 Youth Mixed Team Relay winners:  (Ekaterina Vdovenko & Oleg Naumov)
 Youth Men's Team winners:  (Norbert Horvath, Krisztián Strobl, & Tamas Bence Frohlich)
 Youth Women's Team winners:  (Ekaterina Vdovenko, Ekaterina Makarova, & Sofia Serkina)

Continental modern pentathlon events
 June 6 – 13: 2012 European Junior Modern Pentathlon Championships in  Székesfehérvár
 Junior Individual winners:  Lukas Kontrimavicius (m) /  Sarolta Kovács (f)
 Junior Men's Team Relay winners:  (Maksim Kustov, Dmitry Lukach, & Danil Kalimullin)
 Junior Women's Team Relay winners:  (Rebecca Wain, Kerry Prise, & Kate French)
 Junior Mixed Team Relay winners:  (Adele Stern & Valentin Belaud)
 Junior Men's Team winners:  (Ilya Shugarov, Dmitry Lukach, & Maksim Kustov)
 Junior Women's Team winners:  (Nadezhda Popova, Angelina Marochkina, & Svetlana Lebedeva)
 July 4 – 10: 2012 European Modern Pentathlon Championships in  Sofia
 Individual winners:  Riccardo De Luca (m) /  Laura Asadauskaitė (f)
 Men's Team Relay winners:  (Ilia Frolov, Sergey Karyakin, & Alexander Savkin)
 Women's Team Relay winners:  (Svetlana Lebedeva, Donata Rimšaitė, & Anna Savchenko)
 Mixed Team Relay winners:  (Anastasiya Prokopenko & Mihail Prokopenko)
 Men's Team winners:  (Ilia Frolov, Andrey Moiseyev, & Aleksander Lesun)
 Women's Team winners:  (Evdokia Gretchichnikova, Ekaterina Khuraskina, & Donata Rimšaitė)
 July 18 – 23: 2012 European Youth "A" Modern Pentathlon Championships in  Sofia
 Youth Individual winners:  Sebastian Reder (m) /  Tatsiana Rahachova (f)
 Youth Men's Team Relay winners:  (Tamas Bence Frohlich, Krisztian Strobl, & Norbert Horvath)
 Youth Women's Team Relay winners:  (Marie Oteiza, Pulcherie Delhalle, & Julie Belhamri)
 Youth Mixed Team Relay winners:  Paula Markowska &  Oleg Naumov)
 Youth Men's Team winners:  (Norbert Horvath, Krisztian Strobl, & Tamas Bence Frohlich)
 Youth Women's Team winners:  (Manon Barbaza, Marie Oteiza, & Pulcherie Delhalle)
 August 16 – 18: 2012 European Youth "B" Modern Pentathlon Championships in  Warsaw
 Youth Individual winners:  Alexandr Stepachev (m) /  Eilidh Prise (f)
 Youth Men's Team Relay winners:  (Alexandr Stepachev, Danila Glavatskikh, & Serge Baranov)
 Youth Women's Team Relay winners:  (Anna Zs. Toth, Rebeka Ormandi, & Beáta Jozan)
 Youth Mixed Team Relay winners:  (Eilidh Prise & Henry Choong)
 Youth Men's Team winners:  (Serge Baranov, Danila Glavatskikh, & Alexandr Stepachev)
 Youth Women's Team winners:  (Naomi Craig, Francesca Summers, & Eilidh Prise)
 October 2 – 7: 2012 Pan American & South American Modern Pentathlon Championships in  Buenos Aires
 Individual winners:  Jorge Abraham Camacho (m) /  Yane Marques (f)
 Men's Team winners:  (Nestor Villamayor, José Pereyra, & Emmanuel Zapata)
 Women's Team winners:  (Evelyn Prantera, Jessica Plaza, & Barbara Cordero)
 October 31 – November 4: 2012 Asian Modern Pentathlon Championships in  Kaohsiung
 Individual #1 winners:  Jun Woong-tae (m) /  HAN Song-yi (f)
 Individual #2 winners:  Kim Dae-beom (m) /  ZHU Wenjing (f)

2012 Modern Pentathlon World Cup
 March 8 – 11: MPWC #1 in  Charlotte
 Individual winners:  Ilia Frolov (m) /  Lena Schöneborn (f)
 March 15 – 18: MPWC #2 in  Rio de Janeiro
 Individual winners:  Aleksander Lesun (m) /  Élodie Clouvel (f)
 April 12 – 15: MPWC #3 in  Százhalombatta
 Individual winners:  Nicola Benedetti (m) /  Amélie Cazé (f)
 April 19 – 22: MPWC #4 in  Rostov
 Individual winners:  Ilya Shugarov (m) /  Anastasiya Prokopenko (f)
 May 26 & 27: MPWC #5 (final) in  Chengdu
 Individual winners:  Ilia Frolov (m) /  Laura Asadauskaitė (f)

References

External links
 Union Internationale de Pentathlon Moderne Website (UIPM)

 
Modern pentathlon
2012 in sports